The Coal Mines (Minimum Wage) Act 1912 was an Act of Parliament which gave minimum wage protection to coal miners. It was passed in response to strikes over pay which occurred in the same year.

See also 
 Liberal reforms

References 

United Kingdom Acts of Parliament 1912
United Kingdom labour law
Coal mining in the United Kingdom
Minimum wage law
Coal mining law
1912 in labor relations